A woodlark is a lark in the genus Lullula.

Woodlark may also refer to:

 Woodlark (ship)
 
 
 
 Woodlark Building, in Portland, Oregon, U.S.
 Woodlark Island, an island of Papua New Guinea
 Woodlark cuscus, a species of marsupial
 Woodlark Plate, a tectonic plate in the eastern half of the island of New Guinea